Tmesisternus schaumii is a species of beetle in the family Cerambycidae. It was described by Francis Polkinghorne Pascoe in 1867. It is known from Moluccas, Australia, and the Solomon Islands.

Subspecies
 Tmesisternus schaumii schaumii Pascoe, 1867
 Tmesisternus schaumii leleti Gressitt, 1984
 Tmesisternus schaumii obscurus Heller, 1934
 Tmesisternus schaumii interruptus Heller, 1934
 Tmesisternus schaumii yorkensis (Fairmaire, 1881)
 Tmesisternus schaumii websteri Breuning, 1945

References

schaumii
Beetles described in 1867